Divide is a rural community in Silver Bow County, Montana, United States. It is administered as part of Butte.

History
The community's name is based on its proximity to the Continental Divide. As a station on the Union Pacific Railroad, Divide served as a distribution and stock shipping point for ranchers in the Big Hole Valley.

Geography
Divide is located in the valley of the Big Hole River surrounded by Montana's Pioneer Mountains. The Big Hole River and its creek tributaries provide irrigation for agriculture as well as habitat for several species of trout which support a recreational fishery. Divide is crossed by Interstate 15 and Montana State Highways 43 and 91, as well as the Union Pacific Railroad, although it is no longer served by a station. The population in 2010 was 221 people.

Climate
According to the Köppen Climate Classification system, Divide has a semi-arid climate, abbreviated "BSk" on climate maps.

Literary Association
Divide is an important setting for Reif Larsen's novel The Selected Works of T.S. Spivet. It is the home of the central character and the beginning of his hobo railroad journey across the United States. The community's location on the continental divide serves as a major piece of symbolism in the novel.

References

 "Divide", Montana Official Travel Site
Cheney's Names on the Face of Montana, Mountain Press Publishing Company

Populated places in Silver Bow County, Montana
Neighborhoods in Montana